William Howard Taft III (August 7, 1915 – February 23, 1991) was an American diplomat who served as United States Ambassador to Ireland from 1953 to 1957, and was a grandson of President William Howard Taft and First Lady Helen Louise "Nellie" Taft.

Early life
William Howard Taft III was born on August 7, 1915, and was the eldest of four sons born to Robert A. Taft (1889–1953) and Martha Wheaton Bowers (1889–1958), daughter of Lloyd Wheaton Bowers (1859–1910), the former solicitor general of the United States from 1909 to 1910. His three brothers were: Robert Taft Jr. (1917–1993), who was elected to the U.S. Senate; Lloyd Bowers Taft (1923–1985), who worked as an investment banker in Cincinnati, and Horace Dwight Taft (1925–1983), who became a professor of physics and dean at Yale.
At the time of his birth, his grandfather had just ended his Presidency and had recently become the Kent Professor of Law and Legal History at Yale Law School. Taft graduated from Yale University and earned a doctorate from Princeton University.

Career
After graduating from Princeton, Taft taught English at the University of Maryland and Haverford College. During World War II, Taft became an analyst in military intelligence. After the war ended, he went back to Yale and taught there.

In 1949, he went to Dublin as part of the Marshall Plan aid mission and worked for the Central Intelligence Agency and the Defense Department from 1951 to 1953.

Ambassador to Ireland
In 1953, President Eisenhower appointed Taft U.S. ambassador to Ireland.  His task as ambassador was made easier by the fact that John A. Costello (Taoiseach, 1954–57) was a personal friend; Taft described Costello as "pleasant and unassuming" whereas he had found Éamon de Valera "formal and aloof". (His predecessor, George A. Garrett, had also found Costello more sympathetic than de Valera.) Taft played a considerable part in organizing Costello's successful state visit to the United States in March 1956.

In 1957, Eisenhower appointed R. W. Scott McLeod as his successor to the Ambassadorship and Taft returned to the State Department as a member of its policy planning staff. He remained with State until 1960, when he became Consul General in Mozambique. He retired from the State Department's bureau for scientific, environmental and space affairs in 1977.

Personal life
Taft married Barbara Bradfield, with whom he had four children:
John Thomas Taft
William Howard Taft IV (b. 1945), who married Julia Vadala (1942–2008)
Maria Herron Taft, who married John Clemow, son of Albert George Clemow, in 1971.
Martha Bowers Taft, who married Michael Golden, son of the British Michael Golden, in 1971.
Taft was a member of the Metropolitan Club of Washington, D.C. He died of prostate cancer at his Washington home on February 23, 1991.

See also
 Taft family

References

Further reading

External links

Taft family
Taft School alumni
American people of English descent
Ambassadors of the United States to Ireland
1915 births
1991 deaths
20th-century American politicians
Deaths from prostate cancer